The canton of Neuilly-Saint-Front is a former administrative division in northern France. It was disbanded following the French canton reorganisation which came into effect in March 2015. It had 10,259 inhabitants (2012).

The canton comprised the following communes:

Armentières-sur-Ourcq
Bonnesvalyn
Brumetz
Bussiares
Chézy-en-Orxois
Chouy
Courchamps
La Croix-sur-Ourcq
Dammard
La Ferté-Milon
Gandelu
Grisolles
Hautevesnes
Latilly
Licy-Clignon
Macogny
Marizy-Sainte-Geneviève
Marizy-Saint-Mard
Monnes
Monthiers
Montigny-l'Allier
Neuilly-Saint-Front
Passy-en-Valois
Priez
Rocourt-Saint-Martin
Rozet-Saint-Albin
Saint-Gengoulph
Silly-la-Poterie
Sommelans
Torcy-en-Valois
Troësnes
Veuilly-la-Poterie
Vichel-Nanteuil

Demographics

See also
Cantons of the Aisne department

References

Former cantons of Aisne
2015 disestablishments in France
States and territories disestablished in 2015